Toghli may refer to:
 Toghli Alabad
 Toghli Albu Fatileh
 Toghli Sadat